Upasane (English: Worship) is a 1974 Kannada musical drama film, directed by Puttanna Kanagal. The film produced by Rashi brothers, is based on the novel of the same name, written by Devaki Murthy. The film mostly had women playing the lead roles, consisting of Aarathi, Leelavathi, M. N. Lakshmi Devi, G. V. Sharadha and Advani Lakshmi Devi. Dr. Govinda Mannur, K. S. Ashwath and Seetharam played the male supporting roles. Actor Seetharam was colloquially named as "Upasane" Seetharam for the rest of his career after the release of this film.

The film dealt with the plight of Sharadha (Aarathi) who intends to pursue her career in classical music. The film went on to win multiple high-profile awards at the Karnataka State Film Awards for the year 1974-75 including Best Film, Best Screenplay and Best Cinematography. Aarathi, who played the protagonist at the age of 19, won the Filmfare Best Actress award.

Cast 
 Aarathi as Sharadha
 Leelavathi as Nagamma
 Dr. Govinda Mannur
 K. S. Ashwath as Subba Rao
 Upasane Seetharam as Veene Anantha Shastry 
 Vajramuni as Neelakantaiah
 Advani Lakshmi Devi
 M. N. Lakshmi Devi as Parvathi
 G. V. Sharadha
 G. V. Swarnamma as Radio Rangamma
 Musuri Krishnamurthy as Saveri Sadashivaiah
 Shivaram as Shankarabharana
 H. Ramachandra Shastry

Soundtrack 
The music was composed by Vijaya Bhaskar. The soundtrack included a very famous Purandaradasa kriti rendered by S. Janaki. All the songs composed for the film were received extremely well and considered as evergreen songs.

Awards

Karnataka State Film Awards 1974-75
 First Best Film
 Best Screenplay - Puttanna Kanagal
 Best Dialogue writer - Navarathnaram
 Best Cinematographer - S. V. Srikanth
 Best Editor - V. P. Krishnan
 Best Sound Recording - S. P. Ramanathan

Filmfare Awards South - 1974
 Best Actress - Aarathi

References

External links 
 
 Puttanna's big feats

1974 films
1970s musical drama films
Films about women in India
Films directed by Puttanna Kanagal
Films based on Indian novels
Indian musical drama films
Films about classical music and musicians
Films scored by Vijaya Bhaskar
1970s Kannada-language films
1974 drama films